Book Book is a rural community in the central east part of the Riverina.

The area now known as Book Book lies on the traditional lands of the Wiradjuri people.

Book Book exists now only through a set of old tennis courts and the telephone exchange that sits just off the Tumbarumba road. The tennis courts were used by a local tennis club. There was also a village hall at which dances and other social events were held. There were also Anglican church services held there.

There was a public school at Book Book that first opened, as a 'half-time' school, in October 1924 and closed in December 1987.

Notes and references

External links 
 

Towns in the Riverina
Towns in New South Wales
Ghost towns in New South Wales